Forleo is a surname. Notable people with this surname include:

 Francesco Forleo (1941–2018), Italian politician, former Deputy from 1987 to 1994
 Maria Clementina Forleo (born 1963), prominent Italian preliminary judge
 Marie Forleo (born 1975), American life coach, motivational speaker, author and web television host

Italian-language surnames